Jane Young may refer to:

Jane Young (born 1965), Canadian professional tennis player
Jane Corner Young (1915–2001), American classical composer
Jane E. Young, American lawyer serving as the United States Attorney for the United States District Court for the District of New Hampshire since 2022